The Thirtieth Piece of Silver is a 1920 American silent drama film directed by George L. Cox and starring Margarita Fischer, King Baggot and Forrest Stanley.

Cast
 Margarita Fischer as Leila Cole
 King Baggot as 	Tyler Cole
 Forrest Stanley as 	Captain Peyton Lake
 Lillian Leighton as 	Mignon Brunner

References

Bibliography
 Connelly, Robert B. The Silents: Silent Feature Films, 1910-36, Volume 40, Issue 2. December Press, 1998.

External links
 

1920s American films
1920 films
1920 drama films
1920s English-language films
American silent feature films
Silent American drama films
American black-and-white films
Films directed by George L. Cox
Pathé Exchange films